El-Assasif is a necropolis near Luxor on the West Bank at Thebes, Egypt, Upper Egypt. It is located in the dry bay that leads up to Deir el-Bahari and south of the necropolis of Dra' Abu el-Naga'.

El-Assasif contains burials from the 18th, 22nd, 25th and 26th dynasties of ancient Egypt, covering the period c. 1550 to 525 BC across all three dynasties.

Archaeology 
In November 2018, France's University of Strasbourg announced the discovery of two sarcophagi thought to be more than 3,500 years old with two perfectly preserved mummies and approximately 1,000 funerary statues in the Assasif valley near Luxor. One of the tombs with paintings where the female body found, was opened to the public in front of the international media, but the other one was previously opened by Egyptian antiquities officials.

In October 2019, 30 coffins (3.000 year-old) were uncovered and presented, dating back to the Twenty-second Dynasty by the Egyptian archaeological mission in front of the Hatshepsut Temple. The coffins contain mummies of 23 adult males, five adult females and two children.  The condition of the cachette is said to be exceptionally good, with many of the coffins sealed and intact, with high quality painting and preservation. According to archaeologist Zahi Hawass, mummies were decorated with mixed carvings and designs, including scenes from Egyptian gods, hieroglyphs, and the Book of the Dead, a series of spells that allowed the soul to navigate the afterlife. Some of the coffins had the names of the dead engraved on them.

Notable burials

18th Dynasty 
TT192 – Kharuef
AT28 - Vizier Amenhotep-Huy
TT188 – Parennefer

22nd Dynasty 

Cachette currently under investigation and restoration

25th Dynasty 
TT34 – Mentuemhet
TT37 – Harwa

26th Dynasty 
TT27 – Sheshonq
TT33 – Padiamenope
TT36 – Ibi
TT279 – Pabasa
TT389 – Basa
TT410 – Mutirdis
TT414 – Ankhhor

See also
 List of Theban Tombs

References

Theban tombs